Project MERRIMAC was a domestic espionage operation coordinated under the Office of Security of the CIA. It involved information gathering procedures via infiltration and surveillance on Washington-based anti-war groups that might pose potential threats to the CIA. However, the type of data gathered also included general information on the infrastructure of targeted communities. Project MERRIMAC and its twin program, Project RESISTANCE were both coordinated by the CIA Office of Security. In addition, the twin projects were branch operations that relayed civilian information to their parent program, Operation CHAOS.  The Assassination Archives and Research Center believes that Project MERRIMAC began in February 1967.

See also
 Operation CHAOS
 Project RESISTANCE
 COINTELPRO

References

External links
Project MERRIMAC in the Internet Archive
CHAOS, MERRIMAC, and RESISTANCE | PDF
 Development of Surveillance Technology & Risk of Abuse of Economic Information | PDF

MERRIMAC
MERRIMAC
History of cryptography
MERRIMAC
MERRIMAC
Government databases in the United States